The 1986 Canadian Grand Prix was a Formula One motor race held at Circuit Gilles Villeneuve, Montreal on 15 June 1986. It was the sixth race of the 1986 Formula One World Championship.

The 69-lap race was won from pole position by Nigel Mansell, driving a Williams-Honda. Alain Prost finished second in a McLaren-TAG, with Mansell's teammate Nelson Piquet third. Prost took the lead of the Drivers' Championship by two points from Mansell and Ayrton Senna, who finished fifth in his Lotus-Renault.

Classification

Qualifying

Race

Championship standings after the race

Drivers' Championship standings

Constructors' Championship standings

References

Canadian Grand Prix
Grand Prix
Canadian Grand Prix
Grand Prix